Lane Weston Adams (born November 13, 1989) is an American professional baseball outfielder for the Tigres de Quintana Roo of the Mexican League. He made his Major League Baseball (MLB) debut with the Kansas City Royals in 2014, and has also played for the Atlanta Braves.

Early life

Adams is a Red Oak, Oklahoma native. He is part Native American and a member of Choctaw Nation of Oklahoma.

Adams attended Red Oak High School in Red Oak. Playing guard for the school's basketball team, he scored 3,251 points, making him the fifth-highest scorer in Oklahoma high school basketball history. His 93.7% free throw percentage as a junior led all of Oklahoma.  He committed to attend Missouri State University on a basketball scholarship.

Career

Kansas City Royals
The Royals selected Adams in the 13th round of the 2009 MLB Draft, and he signed with the Royals for a $225,000 signing bonus rather than attend college.

Adams was a 2012 Midwest League Mid-Season All Star. He played for the Northwest Arkansas Naturals of the Class AA Texas League in 2013. He was a 2013 MiLB Royals Organization All Star, and was named Royals’ 2013 co-Minor League Player of the Year with pitcher Yordano Ventura. After the 2013 season, the Royals added Adams to their 40-man roster.

In 2014, playing for the Northwest Arkansas Naturals he batted .269/.352/.427 with 65 runs (tied for 6th in the league), 25 doubles (tied for 5th), 38 stolen bases (3rd) while being caught 6 times, and 9 hit by pitch (tied for 6th) in 524 at bats. Adams was a Mid-Season Texas League All Star and Post-Season All Star. On September 1, 2014, the Royals promoted Adams to the major leagues. He made his Major League debut that night, replacing Raúl Ibañez as a pinch runner in the eighth inning of the Royals' game against the Texas Rangers.

In 2015, again playing for the Northwest Arkansas Naturals, Adams batted .298/.360/.466 with 29 stolen bases (tied for 4th in the league) while being caught 6 times in 373 at bats. He was released in November 2015.

New York Yankees
After the 2015 season, the New York Yankees claimed Adams off of waivers. In 2016 for the Trenton Thunder he batted .253/.343/.363 with 31 stolen bases in 36 attempts in 289 at bats. On July 28, 2016, he was released by the Yankees. He contemplated retiring at 26 years of age.

Chicago Cubs
On August 3, 2016, Adams signed a minor league deal with the Chicago Cubs. Playing for the Tennessee Smokies, he batted .325/.378/.506 with 9 stolen bases without being caught, in 83 at bats. He became a free agent on November 7.

Atlanta Braves
Adams signed a minor league contract with the Atlanta Braves organization on December 13, 2016. Braves manager Brian Snitker said: “I didn’t know who he was. I’d never heard of him.” With the Gwinnett Stripers in 2017, he batted .264/.320/.461 with 15 stolen bases in 18 attempts, in 178 at bats.

The Braves promoted him to the Major Leagues on April 25, 2017. Adams recorded his first major league hit in a game against the Milwaukee Brewers four days later. Adams hit his first major league home run, a three-run shot, against the San Francisco Giants on June 22. On September 10, Adams hit a 2-run, walk off home run against the Miami Marlins in the 11th inning. The home run clinched the NL East for the Washington Nationals. For the 2017 season with the Braves, he batted  .275/.339/.468, and was successful in all 10 of his stolen base attempts, in 109 at bats.

On April 19, 2018, Adams was designated for assignment by the Braves. He refused an assignment to the Gwinnett Stripers and elected free agency on April 27.

Second stint with Cubs
On May 5, 2018, Adams signed a minor league deal with the Chicago Cubs. On June 30 he was released by the Cubs.

Second stint with Braves
On July 16, 2018, Adams signed a minor league deal with the Atlanta Braves. He was called up to the major leagues on September 1. With the Braves in 2018, he batted .240/.345/.520 with one steal in 25 at bats. The Braves outrighted him to the minors on October 31. He elected free agency on November 2.

Through 2018, in his major league career Adams had batted .263/.333/.467 with 11 stolen bases without being caught, in 137 at bats. In his minor league career he had batted .264/.338/.403 with 235 stolen bases while being caught 44 times, in 3,718 at bats.

Philadelphia Phillies
On January 14, 2019, Adams signed a minor league deal with the Philadelphia Phillies. He played for the AAA Lehigh Valley IronPigs, batting .255/.340/.465 with 12 home runs and 29 RBIs in 271 at bats, as he stole eight bases in ten attempts. He was released on July 1, 2019.

Third stint with Braves
On July 31, 2019, Adams signed a minor league deal with the Atlanta Braves. He played 18 games for the Class AA Mississippi Braves. He became a free agent at the end of the season.

Minnesota Twins
On February 17, 2020, Adams signed a minor league deal with the Minnesota Twins. He became a free agent on November 2, 2020.

Acereros de Monclova
On May 20, 2021, Adams signed with the Acereros de Monclova of the Mexican League. Adams hit .263/.324/.326 with 11 RBIs in 26 games, but was released on June 21, 2021.

Tigres de Quintana Roo
On June 24, 2021, Adams signed with the Tigres de Quintana Roo of the Mexican League.

References

External links

1989 births
Living people
People from Le Flore County, Oklahoma
Baseball players from Oklahoma
Major League Baseball outfielders
Kansas City Royals players
Atlanta Braves players
Arizona League Royals players
Idaho Falls Chukars players
Kane County Cougars players
Burlington Royals players
Wilmington Blue Rocks players
Northwest Arkansas Naturals players
Peoria Javelinas players
Omaha Storm Chasers players
Trenton Thunder players
Águilas del Zulia players
American expatriate baseball players in Venezuela
Scranton/Wilkes-Barre RailRiders players
Tennessee Smokies players
Iowa Cubs players
Gwinnett Braves players
Choctaw Nation of Oklahoma people
Native American sportspeople
Gwinnett Stripers players
Lehigh Valley IronPigs players
Acereros de Monclova players
American expatriate baseball players in Mexico
20th-century Native Americans
21st-century Native Americans